Charly-sur-Marne (literally Charly on Marne) is a  commune in the Aisne department in Hauts-de-France in northern France.

Charly was an old fortified city dating from 9th century Burgundy, it was renamed Charly-sur-Marne in 2006.

Geography
The old city lies to the north of the Marne.  The river has moved south through accretion since the town was originally built.  Across the river are the villages of Nogent-l'Artaud and Pavant. The town of Charly is halfway between La Ferté-sous-Jouarre and Château-Thierry, and halfway between Paris and Rheims.

Neighborhoods

 "The H"(also called the City of 40 crazy) 
 Le Petit Val Clos des Buttes
 The Four Corners (downtown)
 The industrial zone (includes Garnier stage, the college and the Skate Park and various factories and shops)
 The Ruvet

History

There is archaeological evidence of a Roman town on the site.  The name of the town is a shortened form of Charles, believed to have been so named because Charles Martel had one of his palaces here.  In 858 Charles the Bald, granted rights to establish the female abbey of Notre-Dame de Soissons, which included extensive seigniory lands in Charly, which dedicated lands lasted until the French revolution. Before 1789, Charly did not have a local government. It was managed by the provost, then baillif, of the abbess of Notre-Dame de Soissons.  After the revolution, in 1792, the former vicar of Charly became mayor.

In 1652, the troops of Cardinal Mazarini were defeated by the Huguenots outside the walls of Charly.

Louis Emile Morlot (*1859, 1907), was the mayor of Charly, a French Deputy, and the leader in the legal battle to keep the name Champagne restricted to the sparking wine produced from the vineyards located between Crouttes-sur-Marne and Trélou.  This protection was ensured by the Treaty of Madrid (1891).

In the First World War, the German First Army  under von Kluck had occupied Charly, when in the First Battle of the Marne, the British Expeditionary Force (BEF) counter-attack crossed the Marne at Charly.

Population

Economy
Charly has extensive vineyards (950 ha.) of Chardonnay and in particular Pinot Meunier (or just Meunier) grapes used in the production of Champagne (appellation controlled).

Sights
 The Convent of the Cordeliers with its many towers.
 St. Martin's Church
 The Tomb of Commandant Cornette (a General of Napoleon)

See also
 Communes of the Aisne department

References

External links

 Official site 
 Charly on the site of Quid including satellite image 
 "Charly:Un Coeur Qui Pétille" 

Communes of Aisne